Flaming Fury can refer to:

 Flaming Fury (1926 film), a 1926 film
 Flaming Fury (1949 film), a 1949 film